Caroline Goode QPM is a British retired police detective, who served for 33 years in the Metropolitan Police in London  and in Counter Terrorism Command.

She was awarded the Queen's Police Medal  in the 2012 New Year Honours for leading the investigation into the murder of  Banaz Mahmod. She wrote a book about the case which also featured as a TV drama, Honour starring Keeley Hawes. Her work on the case involved convictions of the first ever men extradited from Iraq to the UK. They were  jailed for more than 20 years each.

She continued to work to  train other police officers  nationally and internationally to understand Honour Based Violence.

References 

Women Metropolitan Police officers
Living people
Metropolitan Police recipients of the Queen's Police Medal
British women non-fiction writers
Year of birth missing (living people)